Tjaernoeia is a genus of sea snails, marine gastropod mollusks in the informal group Lower Heterobranchia.

Tjaernoeia is the only genus in the family Tjaernoeiidae.

Species 
Species in the genus Tjaernoeia include:
 Tjaernoeia boucheti Warén, 1991 - from deep water in the northeastern Atlantic
 Tjaernoeia exquisita (Jeffreys, 1883) - described from Crete, also known from Ghana
 Tjaernoeia michaeli Engl, 2002
 Tjaernoeia unisulcata (Chaster, 1897)

References